Grand View Estates is an unincorporated community and a census-designated place (CDP) located in and governed by Douglas County, Colorado, United States. The CDP is a part of the Denver–Aurora–Lakewood, CO Metropolitan Statistical Area. The population of the Grand View Estates CDP was 528 at the United States Census 2010. The area lies in ZIP code 80134..

Geography
Grand View Estates is located in northern Douglas County between Stonegate and Parker to the east and Lone Tree to the west.

Demographics

Education
The Douglas County School District serves Grand View Estates.

See also

Outline of Colorado
Index of Colorado-related articles
State of Colorado
Colorado cities and towns
Colorado census designated places
Colorado counties
Douglas County, Colorado
Colorado metropolitan areas
Front Range Urban Corridor
North Central Colorado Urban Area
Denver-Aurora-Boulder, CO Combined Statistical Area
Denver-Aurora-Broomfield, CO Metropolitan Statistical Area

References

External links

Douglas County website
Douglas County School District

Census-designated places in Douglas County, Colorado
Census-designated places in Colorado
Denver metropolitan area